The 2014 World Figure Skating Championships was an international figure skating competition held in Saitama, Japan, at the Saitama Super Arena from March 24 to 30. Medals were awarded in the disciplines of men's singles, ladies' singles, pair skating, and ice dancing. The event also determined the number of entries a country may send to the 2015 World Championships.

Records

The following new ISU best scores were set during this competition:

Qualification
All skaters that represent an ISU member nations and reached the age of 15 before 1 July 2013 were eligible to compete at the World Championships. National associations select entries according to their own criteria but the ISU rules mandate that their athletes must have achieved the required minimum technical score at an international event prior to the World Championships in order to be eligible to contest this event.

Minimum TES

Number of entries per discipline
Based on the results of the 2013 World Championships, each ISU member nation was allowed to send one to three entries per discipline.

Entries
All of the 2013 World champions were absent but the 2014 Olympic men's champion Yuzuru Hanyu, pairs medalists Ksenia Stolbova / Fedor Klimov and Aliona Savchenko / Robin Szolkowy, and ice dancing bronze medalists Elena Ilinykh / Nikita Katsalapov, as well as several team medalists, including Yulia Lipnitskaya, competed in Saitama.

Member nations announced the following entries:

 On 3 March 2014, U.S. Figure Skating stated that Meryl Davis / Charlie White would be replaced by second alternates Alexandra Aldridge / Daniel Eaton. First alternates Madison Hubbell / Zachary Donohue are unable to compete due to injury — Hubbell sustained a torn labrum.
 On 4 March, the Spanish federation said that Javier Raya would not compete due to injury.
 On 7 March, Ukrainian ice dancers Nadezhda Frolenkova / Vitali Nikiforov withdrew due to Frolenkova's back injury.
 On 20 March, American pair Caydee Denney / John Coughlin withdrew due to Denney's ankle injury and were replaced by Felicia Zhang / Nathan Bartholomay.
 On 21 March, France's Florent Amodio withdrew from the men's event.
 On 28 March, Russia's Ekaterina Bobrova / Dmitri Soloviev withdrew before the short dance, Soloviev having sustained a groin injury in practice.
 On 29 March, the Czech Republic's Michal Březina withdrew before the men's free skating.
 On 29 March, the United Kingdom's Jenna McCorkell withdrew before the ladies' free skating due to a hamstring injury.

Schedule
All dates/times are listed as local time in Japan. The Western hemisphere saw some of the events on the previous day, due to the time zone difference.

Overview
Japan was named as the host in June 2011. Saitama was confirmed as the city in February 2013.

Olympic bronze medalists, Aliona Savchenko / Robin Szolkowy of Germany, took the lead in the pairs' short program, two points ahead of Canada's Meagan Duhamel / Eric Radford, who edged Olympic silver medalists Ksenia Stolbova / Fedor Klimov of Russia by under a point. Savchenko/Szolkowy ranked first in the free skating by a six-point margin and won their fifth World title by an overall margin of nearly nine points. Stolbova/Klimov were awarded their first World medal, silver, finishing five points ahead of Duhamel/Radford. The latter pair outscored fellow Canadians Kirsten Moore-Towers / Dylan Moscovitch for the bronze for the second year in a row.

Japan's Tatsuki Machida ranked first in the men's short program, with Spain's Javier Fernández and 2014 Olympic champion Yuzuru Hanyu in second and third respectively. Hanyu placed first in the free skating and won his first World title. Silver went to Machida, finishing 0.33 of a point behind Hanyu. Finishing six points back, Fernández won his second World bronze medal.

The ice dancing event was closely contested. Two points separated the top four in the short dance. 2014 European champions, Anna Cappellini / Luca Lanotte of Italy, took the lead, outscoring Canada's Kaitlyn Weaver / Andrew Poje by 0.5 and France's Nathalie Pechalat / Fabian Bourzat by 1.5. Slightly under three points separated the top four in the free dance and the overall scores were even closer. Cappellini/Lanotte became the second Italian ice dancers to win the World title, finishing 0.02 of a point ahead of silver medalists Weaver/Poje and 0.06 ahead of Pechalat/Bourzat, who won their second World bronze medal. 2014 Olympic bronze medalists, Elena Ilinykh / Nikita Katsalapov of Russia, placed first in the segment but finished off the podium, just 1.05 behind the gold medalists.

2008 and 2010 World champion, Mao Asada of Japan, broke the previous world record set by Kim Yuna in the short program, scoring 78.66, 1.42 points ahead of the 2012 World champion, Carolina Kostner of Italy, and 4.12 ahead of the 2014 European champion, Yulia Lipnitskaya. Asada also placed first in the free skating by a margin of five points. Lipnitskaya and Anna Pogorilaya, both 15-year-old Russians, were second and third respectively and Kostner placed sixth in the segment. Asada won her third world title by a total margin of 9.19 points, Lipnitskaya was awarded the silver medal in her first appearance at the World Championships, and Kostner took the bronze, her sixth World medal.

Results

Men

Ladies

Pairs

Ice dancing

Medals summary

Medalists
Medals for overall placement:

Small medals for placement in the short segment:

Small medals for placement in the free segment:

Medals by country
Table of medals for overall placement:

Table of small medals for placement in the short segment:

Table of small medals for placement in the free segment:

References

External links
 Official website of Saitama 2014
 
 International Skating Union event page

World Figure Skating Championships, 2014
World Figure Skating Championships
World Figure Skating Championships
International figure skating competitions hosted by Japan
Sport in Saitama (city)
Figure skating in Japan